The Northern Mariana Islands Football Association (NMIFA) is the governing body of football in the Northern Mariana Islands.  It was founded in 2005 by US-Attorney Peter Coleman to replace the now-defunct NMISF, who had aministered the sport on the islands up to around 2002. The Association received associate membership into the East Asian Football Federation in December 2006, with full membership coming in August 2008. The association was admitted as a provisional member of the Asian Football Confederation in July 2009. On 9 December 2020 during the 30th AFC Congress, the Northern Mariana Islands Football Association (NMIFA) became the 47th full member association of the AFC. In October 2021 FIFA Head of MA Governance Rolf Tanner announced at the 11th Northern Mariana Islands Football Association Ordinary Congress that the global organization had received the island's application for membership.
 
The association runs the M*League and Women's M*League, the top levels of domestic competition within the commonwealth. It operates men's, women's and youth national football teams.

National football stadium

See also
 Northern Mariana Islands national football team
 Northern Mariana Islands women's national football team

References

External links
 Official website
 Northern Mariana Islands at AFC site
 Northern Mariana Islands Football Association at the EAFF website.

Football in the Northern Mariana Islands
Asian Football Confederation member associations
Sports organizations established in 2005